The following tables show state-by-state results in the Australian Senate at the 1990 federal election. Senators total 31 coalition (29 Liberal, one coalition National, one CLP), 32 Labor, one WA Green, three non-coalition National, eight Democrats, and one independent. Senator terms are six years (three for territories), and took their seats from 1 July 1990, except the territories who took their seats immediately.

Australia

New South Wales

Victoria

Queensland

Western Australia

South Australia

Tasmania

Australian Capital Territory

Northern Territory

See also

1990 Australian federal election
Candidates of the Australian federal election, 1990
Members of the Australian Senate, 1990–1993

Notes

References

External links
Adam Carr's Election Archive

1990 elections in Australia
Senate 1990